Florian Mokrski (Jelita Coat of arms) was born around 1305 and died on February 6, 1380 in Kraków) and the son of Peter Mokrski. Florian was a Polish Roman Catholic priest  who served as the Archbishop of Kraków between 1367-1380. Archbishop Mokrski consecrated Polish Franciscan Andrzej Jastrzebiec the first Bishop of the Diocese of Siret in 1371.

Sources 
 Krzysztof Rafał Prokop, Poczet biskupów krakowskich, Wydawnictwo św. Stanisława BM, Kraków 1999, s. 64-67
 Bolesław Przybyszewski "Krótki zarys dziejów diecezji krakowskiej" t.1 wyd. Kraków 1989
 Feliks Kiryk "Nauk przemożnych perła" wyd. Kraków 1986

See also 
 Florian Mokrski Palace in Cracow

References 

1380 deaths
14th-century births
Canons of Wrocław
Bishops of Kraków